XHRASA-FM is a radio station on 94.1 FM in San Luis Potosí, San Luis Potosí, Mexico. It is owned by Cadena RASA and carries its Candela grupera format.

History
XEEQ-AM 760 received its concession on April 22, 1964. It was owned by Radio Potosina, S.A. and broadcast as a 250-watt daytimer with the name "La Pantera" and a rock format.

In the 1980s, XEEQ affiliated to Radiorama. Radiorama, however, experienced some corporate turbulence in the mid-1990s, and XEEQ left the group, declared bankruptcy and was shuttered for two years.

After going dark, the station returned with a new frequency, new call letters and a higher power. XERASA-AM 750 broadcast with 1,000 watts day and 100 night; the power increase had been authorized in October 1995, and the callsign change was granted in January 1997. It carried an English-language oldies format similar to RASA's XENK-AM in Mexico City. In 2006, XERASA flipped to grupera under the Candela name.

2010 saw the sign-on of XHRASA-FM 94.1. 750 AM was shut off in April 2012, but it returned six months later and broadcast until 2015.

References

Radio stations in San Luis Potosí